Amit Majumder (born 1 January 1991) is a Bangladeshi first-class cricketer who plays for Khulna Division. In April 2017, he scored his first century in List A cricket, playing for Khelaghar Samaj Kallyan Samity in the 2016–17 Dhaka Premier Division Cricket League. He made his Twenty20 debut for Khelaghar Samaj Kallyan Samity in the 2018–19 Dhaka Premier Division Twenty20 Cricket League on 25 February 2019.

See also
 List of Khulna Division cricketers

References

External links
 

1991 births
Living people
Bangladeshi cricketers
Khulna Division cricketers
Khelaghar Samaj Kallyan Samity cricketers
People from Khulna